Ernst Falkner (24 February 1909 – 27 October 1950) was a German politician of the Bavaria Party (BP) and former member of the German Bundestag.

Life 
Falkner was a member of the German Bundestag from the first federal election in 1949 until his death in 1950.

Literature

References

1909 births
1950 deaths
Bavaria Party politicians
Members of the Bundestag for Bavaria
Members of the Bundestag 1949–1953
Members of the Bundestag for the Bavaria Party